Ante Brkić (born 31 March 1988) is a Croatian chess grandmaster.

Chess career
He won the Croatian Chess Championship in 2010 and has represented his country in a number of Chess Olympiads, including 2004 (2/4 on board 6), 2006 (3.5/5 on board 6), 2012 (2.5/6 on board 4), 2016 (6/10 on board 5) and 2018 (5/8 on board 4).

He played in the Chess World Cup 2015, where he was defeated in the first round by Laurent Fressinet.

In 2019, he won the 26th Zadar Open with 7/9 points.

He qualified again for the Chess World Cup 2021 where, ranked 102nd, he defeated Sergio Barrientos 2-0 in the first round, 27th seed Yuriy Kryvoruchko 1.5-0.5 in the second round and Salem Saleh 2-0 in the third round.

References

External links 
 
 Ante Brkić chess games at 365Chess.com
 

1988 births
Living people
Chess grandmasters
Croatian chess players